Mount Pleasant, New Jersey may refer to several places:
Mount Pleasant, Bergen County, New Jersey
Mount Pleasant, Burlington County, New Jersey
Mount Pleasant, Hunterdon County, New Jersey
Mount Pleasant, Monmouth County, New Jersey
Mount Pleasant, Newark, New Jersey